The Poulin JP.20 Globe Trotter was a two-seat, high-wing monoplane touring aircraft built in France in the early 1950s.

Specifications (JP.20 Globe Trotter)

References

Further reading
 

1950s French civil utility aircraft
High-wing aircraft
Single-engined tractor aircraft
Aircraft first flown in 1952